Statistics of Nemzeti Bajnokság I in the 1956 season.

Overview
It was performed by 12 teams. Season did not finish due to the Hungarian Revolution of 1956.

League standings

Results

References
Hungary - List of final tables (RSSSF)

Nemzeti Bajnokság I seasons
1955–56 in Hungarian football
1956–57 in Hungarian football
Hun
Hun